An Act of Tynwald is a statute passed by Tynwald, the parliament of the Isle of Man.

Structure
Acts of Tynwald are structured in a similar format to Acts of the Parliament of the United Kingdom.

Commencement
Originally, each Act began with the following formula:

In later Acts, this was modernised as follows:

Modern-day Acts now omit this formula altogether.

Long title
Each Act has a long title, which summarises the purpose of the statute. An example from a Customs Act is:

Enacting formula
The substantive provisions of the Act are preceded by an enacting formula, which is currently worded as follows:

Until 1 January 2008, a longer form of words had been used:

In earlier Acts, commencing with the revestment of the island to the British Crown, the following form was used:

Short title and citation

In modern times, Acts of Tynwald have specified a short title by which they may be cited for convenience; e.g. "Isle of Man Constitution Act 1961". Acts from the 1970s onwards can also be cited by year and chapter number; e.g. "1990 c. 3".

In British legislation, Acts of Tynwald are cited by the short title, with the addition of the text "(An Act of Tynwald)"; similarly, British legislation is referenced in Manx law by the short title and "(An Act of Parliament)".

Secondary legislation
The Isle of Man also has a form of delegated legislation, in the form of rules, orders and regulations made under authority of a particular Act of Tynwald. These can be either in an affirmative form (Tynwald must vote to bring them into effect), or a negative form (they will have effect unless one or more members of Tynwald seeks a vote on the matter).

Printing
, the government printer for Acts of Tynwald is The Copy Shop in Bucks Road, Douglas.

See also 
 List of Acts of Tynwald
 Act of Congress
 Act of Parliament

Manx law
Tynwald